Alexander Bravo (July 27, 1930 – September 1, 2020) is a former American football player. He played defensive back with the Los Angeles Rams and Oakland Raiders, as well as the Saskatchewan Roughriders in the Canadian Football League.

Early life 
Bravo graduated from Santa Barbara High School, where he was an all-state halfback.

College career 
He played college football at California Polytechnic State University and is a member of their athletic hall of fame (inducted 1988). For Cal Poly, Bravo collected all-conference honors in 1951, 1952 and 1953, along the way earning the nickname "Boom Boom" for his explosive running style.

Professional career 
After being selected 106th overall by the L.A. Rams in the 1954 NFL Draft, Bravo would later go on to sign with the then-AFL's Oakland Raiders. Bravo was converted primarily to defensive back at the pro level.

Bravo continued his involvement in sports, working as a football official and track and field starter into his late 80s.

References

1930 births
Living people
American football defensive backs
Canadian football defensive backs
American players of Canadian football
Cal Poly Mustangs football players
Saskatchewan Roughriders players
Los Angeles Rams players
Oakland Raiders players
Players of American football from Tucson, Arizona
American Football League players
Track and field people from California